Enrique 'Kike' Javier Montesinos Echávarri (born 14 May 1994) is a Spanish footballer who plays as a central defender for CE Constància.

Club career
Born in Palma, Mallorca, Balearic Islands, Echávarri was a RCD Mallorca youth graduate, and made his senior debut with Zamora CF's reserves in 2013, in the regional leagues. After representing lower league sides CD Génova and CE Esporles, he moved abroad for the first time in his career after agreeing to a contract with Bolivian club Club Deportivo San José on 18 January 2016.

Echávarri made his professional debut on 13 March 2016, starting in a 1–1 away draw against Nacional Potosí. On 28 September, he received a straight red card in a 0–3 loss at Club Blooming.

On 5 January 2017, Echávarri returned to his home country and signed for Elche CF Ilicitano in the fourth level. After featuring sparingly, he moved to Segunda División B club Extremadura UD on 8 July.

References

External links

1994 births
Living people
Footballers from Palma de Mallorca
Spanish footballers
Association football defenders
Segunda División B players
Tercera División players
Bolivian Primera División players
Elche CF Ilicitano footballers
Extremadura UD footballers
Córdoba CF B players
Club San José players
CE Constància players
Spanish expatriate footballers
Spanish expatriate sportspeople in Bolivia
Expatriate footballers in Bolivia